Woman of the World may refer to:

 Woman of the World/To Make a Man, 1969 album by Loretta Lynn
 "Woman of the World (Leave My World Alone)", song by Loretta Lynn
 "Woman of the World" (Aerosmith song), 1974
 A Woman of the World, 1925 silent film starring Pola Negri
 Woman of the World (The Best of 2007–2018), compilation album by Amy Macdonald
 "Woman of the World", song by Amy Macdonald from the above album
 "Woman of the World", song by Double from the album Blue
 "Woman of the World", song by Donald Byrd from the album Street Lady
 "A Woman of the World", song by The Divine Comedy from Casanova